is a railway station in Yukuhashi, Fukuoka Prefecture, Japan. It is on the Tagawa Line, operated by the Heisei Chikuhō Railway. Trains arrive roughly every 30 minutes.

The station name references a kappa, a monster in Japanese folklore.

On 1 April 2009, the Yukuhashi branch of a Yamaguchi-based insurance agency, acquired naming rights to the station.

External links
Imagawa-Kappa Station (Heisei Chikuhō Railway website)

References

Railway stations in Fukuoka Prefecture
Railway stations in Japan opened in 1990
Heisei Chikuhō Railway Tagawa Line